The Indus Fan is one of the most significant depositional feature of the offshore Indus basin. It is the second largest fan system in the world after the Bengal Fan between India, Bangladesh and the Andaman Islands. The Indus fan was deposited in an unconfined setting on the continental slope, rise and basin floor, covering much of the Arabian Sea. The entire fan extends over an area of 110,000 square kilometers with greater than 9 km of sediment accumulating near the toe-of-slope.

History 
The Indus Basin was created through the erosion of Karakoram and the Western Himalayas. Fan sedimentation is estimated to have begun at the end of the Oligocene or beginning of the Miocene, during a period of faster Himalayan exhumation, possibly linked to Monsoon intensification.
The fan rapidly gained sediment during the middle Miocene. The upper Indus Fan, both ancient and recent, consists some of the largest channel-levee systems (CLS). These channel-levee systems act as conduits for carrying and depositing sediments into the deeper part of the basin. The coarser grained sediments are deposited in the channel belts whereas the finer grained silts and clays are deposited along the levees. This arrangement of sediments is ideal for stratigraphic plays and is why these channel-levee systems are important to the petroleum industry.

References 

River deltas of Asia